Krista Lepik (born 26 April 1964) is a retired Estonian biathlete. She competed at the 1992 Winter Olympics and the 1994 Winter Olympics.

References

1964 births
Living people
People from Väike-Maarja Parish
Biathletes at the 1992 Winter Olympics
Biathletes at the 1994 Winter Olympics
Estonian female biathletes
Olympic biathletes of Estonia